Aisha Muhammed-Oyebode (born 24 December 1963) is a lawyer, entrepreneur, author, activist and philanthropist. She is currently the Group chief executive officer of Asset Management Group Limited and the chief executive officer of Murtala Muhammed Foundation.

Early life and education 
Muhammed-Oyebode is the first of six children born to the late General Murtala Ramat Muhammed, a former Head of state of Nigeria. Her mother is Ajoke Murtala Muhammed. Muhammed-Oyebode's father was assassinated when she was twelve years old, and her mother raised her and her younger siblings. She lost her immediate younger brother, Zackari Muhammed, in 1993.

Muhammed-Oyebode had her secondary school education at the Queen's College, Lagos. She studied law at the University of Buckingham, UK, and holds an LLB Honors degree. Her Master's in Law degree is in Public International Law from King's College, University of London and she also has an MBA in Finance from the Imperial College, London. She recently obtained a doctorate degree from the SOAS University of London.

Career 
Muhammed-Oyebode had her national youth service at the Ministry of External Affairs in Lagos between 1988 and 1989. She began her career as an associate at the firm of Ajumogobia, Okeke, Oyebode & Aluko in Lagos in 1989. In 1991, she established Asset Management Group Limited, a real estate development company, where she currently sits as Group chief executive officer.

Muhammed-Oyebode has served on the board of different organisations, including as Chair of the Board of Trustees of Unity School Old Students Association, where she served for seven years before resigning. She was also a non-executive director of Diamond Bank Nigeria, where she stepped down in 2018. In 2017, she was appointed as a board member of the Women's Leadership Board of the Women and Public Policy Program at the Harvard Kennedy School, Cambridge, Massachusetts. Other board memberships include as Board Chair, Lekoil Nigeria Limited and as Board Chair, NEEM Foundation.

Philanthropy/activism 
Aisha Muhammed-Oyebode is a philanthropist and she founded the Murtala Muhammed Foundation in 2001. The foundation was named in honour of her late father and was created as a way to immortalise her father and carry on his legacies. Through the foundation, she is speaking out and addressing social issues such as insecurity, poverty, education and development of the Northern states of Nigeria.

Muhammed-Oyebode is an activist and has been at the forefront of the calls to return the 276 Chibok Schoolgirls who were kidnapped from the Chibok Local Government of Borno State, Nigeria, by Boko Haram terrorists in April 2014. She is one of the co-founders of the Bring Back our Girls Movement.

Bibliography 

Aisha Muhammed-Oyebode is the author of The Stolen Daughters of Chibok, a book that documents personal interviews from 152 of the parents/relatives of the 276 abducted Chibok schoolgirls.

Awards and recognition

Personal life 
Aisha Muhammed-Oyebode is married to Gbenga Oyebode, a lawyer and co-founder of Aluko & Oyebode. She has three children.

References 

1963 births
Living people